Rumbold (sometimes Rumwold) is an Old English name that may refer to:

People
St. Rumbold of Buckingham (662), English infant saint
Saint Rumbold of Mechelen (6th/7th/8th century?), Irish or Scottish Christian missionary
Rumbold baronets including:
Sir Thomas Rumbold, 1st Baronet (1736–1791), British politician and administrator in India
Sir George Rumbold, 2nd Baronet (1764–1807), British diplomat
Sir Arthur Carlos Henry Rumbold, 5th Baronet (1820–1869), British soldier and diplomat 
Sir Horace Rumbold, 8th Baronet (1829–1913), British diplomat 
Sir Horace Rumbold, 9th Baronet (1869–1941), British diplomat
Sir Anthony Rumbold, 10th Baronet (1911–1983), British diplomat
Dame Angela Rumbold (1932–2010), British politician
Charles Rumbold (1788–1857), British politician
George Rumbold (1911–1995), English professional footballer
Gyula Rumbold (1887–1959), Hungarian amateur footballer who competed in the 1912 Summer Olympics
Hugo Rumbold (1884–1932), British theatrical scenery and costume designer
Richard Rumbold (1622–1685) plotted to assassinate Charles II of England

Characters
Cuthbert Rumbold, a character in the sitcom Are You Being Served?

See also
Rumwold (disambiguation)
St. Rumbold's Cathedral, Mechelen, Antwerp, Belgium